The favorites in the event were the same lifters that made up the first four places at the 1968 Summer Olympics.  The snatch was won by Koji Miki of Japan with a lift of 112.5 kg.  But in an out-of-competition attempt to break the world record, he improved his own mark from 113.5 kg to 114.0 kg.  The lifter placing 12th, Soviet-born Israeli Ze'ev Friedman, would become one of the victims of the kidnapping by the Palestinian Black September group.  Friedman was killed in the firefight at Fürstenfeldbruck Air Base.

Results
Total of best lifts in military press, snatch and jerk.  Ties are broken by the lightest bodyweight.

Final

Key: WR = world record; OR = Olympic record; DNF = did not finish; NVL = no valid lift

References

External links
Official report

Weightlifting at the 1972 Summer Olympics